Sir Charles Vernon (c. 1683–1762), of Farnham, Surrey, was a British merchant and Tory politician who sat in the House of Commons between 1731 and 1761.

Vernon was the third son of Sir Thomas Vernon, MP who was a London merchant and director of the East India Company   and his wife  Anne. He became a merchant trading with Turkey. Before 1717, he married Anne Catherine Vernon, daughter  of George Vernon of Farnham. He was knighted on  27 October 1717.

Vernon, was returned unopposed as Member of Parliament for Chipping Wycombe on the interest of his nephew, Edmund Waller at a by election on  27 January 1731.  His brother, Thomas Vernon  was a Tory and presumably Vernon was Tory too, voting consistently  against the Administration.  At the 1734 British general election Waller stood for Wycombe and Marlow, and chose Marlow leaving an opening for Vernon to come in again at Wycombe at a by election on 17 February 1735. In Parliament, Vernon withdrew  on the motion for the dismissal of Walpole in February 1741. At the 1741 British general election, both seats at Wycombe were taken by the Wallers and Vernon did not stand. At the  1747 British general election, Vernon  was returned at Ripon on the interest of his son-in-law, William Aislabie, and was classed as ‘Opposition’.

Vernon was returned for Ripon again at the  1754 British general election. He did not stand in  1761.

Vernon died on 4 April 1762, aged 78 leaving four sons and two daughters.

References

1680s births
1762 deaths
Members of the Parliament of Great Britain for English constituencies
British MPs 1727–1734
British MPs 1734–1741
British MPs 1747–1754
British MPs 1754–1761